Adrien Borel (19 March 1886, in Paris – 19 September 1966, in Beaumont-lès-Valence) was a French psychiatrist and psychoanalyst.

1886 births
1966 deaths
French psychiatrists
French psychoanalysts
Physicians from Paris